Eric Burden is a former Welsh professional darts player who competed in the 1980s and 1990s.

Career

Burden played in the BDO World Darts Championship four times and lost in the first round each time. He lost in 1989 to Russell Stewart, in 1991 to Bob Sinnaeve, in 1994 to Leo Laurens and in 1996 to Per Skau. Burden also played in the Winmau World Masters three times, again losing in the first round each time. In 1985, he lost to Tony Payne, in 1993 to George Dalgleish and in 1994 to Les Wallace. Despite his poor record on televised majors, Burden fared better on floor events, reaching the final of the 1990 WDF Europe Cup, losing to Phil Taylor and the 1995 WDF World Cup, losing to Martin Adams. Burden won the 1994 Swedish Open, beating local player Magnus Caris in the final.

Burden also appeared on the popular British game show, "Bullseye" scoring 207 in 1993.

Burden Quit the BDO in 1999.

World Championship Performances

BDO
 1989: 1st Round (lost to Russell Stewart 1–3) (sets)
 1991: 1st Round (lost to Bob Sinnaeve 2–3)
 1994: 1st Round (lost to Leo Laurens 0–3)
 1996: 1st Round (lost to Per Skau 0–3)

External links
Profile and stats on Darts Database

Living people
Welsh darts players
British Darts Organisation players
1945 births